Justus Johann Friedrich Dotzauer (20 January 1783 – 6 March 1860) was a German cellist and composer.

Life

Early life and career
His father, a pastor, encouraged his interest in music. In early years he played piano, violin and cello, also horn and clarinet, and studied theory and composition with the organist , a pupil of Johann Christian Kittel.

He moved in 1805 to Leipzig, where he played in the Gewandhaus Orchestra. During this period he visited the cellist Bernhard Romberg in Berlin, who influenced his playing. With Heinrich August Matthaei, Bartolomeo Campagnoli and Johann Georg Hermann Voigt, Dotzauer was a founder of the Gewandhaus Quartet.

Dresden
In 1811 Dotzauer was appointed cellist of the Dresden Court Orchestra; from 1821 he was principal cellist. During this time in the orchestra he played under Carl Maria von Weber, and later under Richard Wagner, playing in the premieres of Wagner's operas Rienzi and The Flying Dutchman.

He made concert tours of Germany, Austria and the Netherlands. He was a noted teacher, his students including Friedrich August Kummer and Karl Drechsler. His two sons Justus Bernhard Friedrich and Karl Louis became musicians.

Dotzauer remained in the orchestra until retirement in 1850; he died in Dresden in 1860.

Compositions
Dotzauer composed many studies and exercises for solo cello; other compositions include masses and other church music, an opera, 9 cello concertos, and chamber music including string quartets.

References

External links

1783 births
1860 deaths
19th-century classical composers
19th-century German composers
19th-century German male musicians
Composers for cello
German classical cellists
German male classical composers
German Romantic composers
People from Saxe-Hildburghausen